Auguste Strobl (24 June 1807 - 22 January 1871, Passau) was a German beauty of the 19th century. The daughter of a royal chief accountant, she also appeared in the Gallery of Beauties gathered by Ludwig I of Bavaria.

Life 
It is unknown how she came to Ludwig's attention, though he wrote poems to her and had her painted by the court painter Joseph Karl Stieler for his Gallery, but Stieler's first version chose a view that over-emphasised her goose-neck and displeased its commissioner. As Ludwig had wanted Strobl's beauty documented naturalistically, he forbade Stieler to amend this first version to correct or reduce the neck. Stieler had to paint her again, but this time in an uncomfortable position, with the neck somewhat hidden by a necklace. Ludwig briefly considered placing both Stieler's versions in his Gallery, but in the end only chose to take the second one. The first one was lost, perhaps being given back to the artist, until it resurfaced on the art market in 1976 and bought by Munich's Residenzmuseum. A miniaturepainting by Stieler of the second version is in a private collection.

In 1831, with Ludwig's approval, she married the forester Hilber von Ergoldsbach, with whom she had 5 children. Ludwig visited her in 1835 and took this chance to address one last poem to her - he possibly offered her the first version of the painting to her as a present on this occasion, with it being refused. No other details of her life are known.

Bibliography 
Gerhard Hojer: Die Schönheitsgalerie König Ludwigs I. 2. neugestaltete Auflage, Schnell & Steiner, München 1983, 

1807 births
1871 deaths
People from the Kingdom of Bavaria